Visitors to Honduras must obtain a visa from one of the Honduran diplomatic missions unless they come from one of the visa exempt countries. All visitors must hold a passport valid for 3 months.

Visa policy map

Visa exemption 
Holders of passports of the following 85 jurisdictions can visit Honduras without a visa for up to 90 days (unless otherwise noted):

1 – 30 days

ID - May also enter with an ID card if come from a country that is part of the CA-4 Agreement.

Nationals of  holding passports for public affairs do not require a visa.

Visa exemption also applies to residents of countries that are visa exempt as well as holders of a valid visa issued by Canada, the United States or a Schengen member state. This does not apply to nationals of Afghanistan, Algeria, Angola, Armenia, Bangladesh, Botswana, Republic of the Congo, Democratic Republic of the Congo, Cuba, Eritrea, Ethiopia, Ghana, Iran, Iraq, Jordan, Kenya, Laos, Lebanon, Liberia, Libya, Mali, Mongolia, Mozambique, Nepal, Nigeria, North Korea, Oman, Pakistan, Sierra Leone, Somalia, Sri Lanka, Sudan, Syria, Timor-Leste, Venezuela, Vietnam and Yemen.

Holders of diplomatic, official or service passports of Belarus, Bolivia, China, Cuba, Dominica, Egypt, Fiji, Grenada, Guyana, Haiti, India, Jamaica, Kenya, Libya, Montenegro, Morocco, Pakistan, Papua New Guinea, Peru, Philippines, Serbia, Suriname, and Thailand and holders of diplomatic passports of Palestine do not require a visa.

The government of Honduras requires proof of yellow fever vaccination only if a traveller is arriving from a country with risk of yellow fever:
Angola,
Benin,
Burkina Faso,
Burundi,
Cameroon,
Central African Republic,
Chad,
Congo, Republic of the,
Côte d'Ivoire,
Democratic Republic of the Congo,
Equatorial Guinea,
Ethiopia,
Gabon,
Gambia, The,
Ghana,
Guinea,
Guinea-Bissau,
Kenya,
Liberia,
Mali,	Mauritania,
Niger,
Nigeria,
Senegal,
Sierra Leone,
South Sudan,
Sudan,
Togo,
Uganda,	
Argentina,
Bolivia,
Brazil,
Colombia,
Ecuador,
French Guiana,
Guyana,
Panama,
Paraguay,
Peru,
Suriname,
Trinidad and Tobago and
Venezuela

Central America-4 Border Control Agreement 
The Central America-4 Border Control Agreement is a treaty between Guatemala, El Salvador, Honduras and Nicaragua. A visa issued by one of the four countries is honored by all four of the countries. The time period for the visa, however, applies to the total time spent in any of the four countries without leaving the CA-4 area.

See also

Central America-4 Border Control Agreement
Visa requirements for Honduran citizens

References

Honduras
Foreign relations of Honduras